Metoponrhis is a genus of moths of the family Noctuidae. The genus was described by Staudinger in 1888.

Species
 Metoponrhis albirena Christoph, 1887
 Metoponrhis karakumensis Gerasimov, 1931
 Metoponrhis marginata Hampson, 1898
 Metoponrhis rungsi Lucas, 1936

References

Calpinae